Pronematus is a genus of mites belonging to the family Tydeidae. These mites are similar to Tydeus spp but can be distinguished by the lack of any claws on the first pair of legs.

Species
Species include:
Pronematus bonatii
Pronematus davisi
Pronematus mcgregori
Pronematus pruni
Pronematus sextoni
Pronematus testatus
Pronematus ubiquitus
Pronematus vandykei

References
Fauna Europaea
New species of mites of the families Tydeidae and Labidostommidae (Acarina: Prostigmata) collected from South African plants Magdelena K.P. Meyer & P.A.J. Ryke Acarologia vol I

Trombidiformes genera